The Jinbei F50 is a compact MPV produced by Jinbei.

Overview
The Jinbei F50 debuted on the 2017 Shanghai Auto Show. The engine of the F50 is a 1.6-litre naturally aspirated engine producing a maximum output of 118hp（87kW）and 154N·m. The engine is mated to a 5-speed manual transmission, and the official fuel consumption is 6.7L/100km. and was launched in China by May 2017 with prices ranging from 59,900 yuan to 80,900 yuan.

References

External links

official site

Minivans
Full-size vehicles
Cars introduced in 2017
Front-wheel-drive vehicles
2010s cars
F50